Trumai may refer to:
 Trumai people, an ethnic group of Brazil
 Trumai language, their language

Language and nationality disambiguation pages